Hornchurch was a local government district in southwest Essex from 1926 to 1965, formed as an urban district for the civil parish of Hornchurch. It was greatly expanded in 1934 with the addition of Cranham, Great Warley, Rainham, Upminster and Wennington; and in 1935 by gaining North Ockendon. Hornchurch Urban District Council was based at Langtons House in Hornchurch from 1929. The district formed a suburb of London and with a population peaking at 131,014 in 1961, it was one of the largest districts of its type in England. It now forms the greater part of the London Borough of Havering in Greater London.

History

Background
The ancient parish of Hornchurch had been coterminous with the liberty and manor of Havering since its formation in antiquity. Havering-atte-Bower and Romford formed chapelries and were split off as parishes in the 1790s and 1849 respectively. The liberty was abolished in 1892; although by this date in Hornchurch it had already been superseded by various ad-hoc bodies, such as the Romford Poor Law Union and the Romford Rural Sanitary District. The Hornchurch parish passed to Romford Rural District in 1894 and formed part of the London Traffic Area from 1924.

Gaining urban status
In 1925 Hornchurch Parish Council applied for conversion of the parish to an urban district. The Romford Rural District Council and Hornchurch Ratepayers' Association opposed Hornchurch gaining urban powers. The parish council held a vote on the matter with eight in favour of urban powers and seven against. In 1926 the parish of Hornchurch was removed from the rural district.

Interwar reorganisation
Following the Local Government Act 1929, in 1930 it was proposed that the northwestern section (west of Park Lane) and northeastern section (Harold Wood) would transfer to Romford Urban District. Romford Urban District Council rejected the scheme with the clerk of the council referring to the area west of Park Lane as the "Sloper's Island" slum and the worst part of the district. The council felt the opportunity had been missed to make the Romford/Hornchurch boundary more regular and also desired the transfer of the Roneo factory to Romford. Alternative schemes were proposed by Romford Urban District Council and Dagenham Urban District Council to annex more of Hornchurch. This would result in Hornchurch becoming unviable as a local government unit unless it merged with Upminster. It was decided in 1933 that the Harold Wood section would not transfer to Romford and the southern part of Hornchurch would not transfer to Dagenham.

As part of the county review order in 1934 the urban district was extended to the east, by gaining  from Romford Rural District. This area corresponded to all of the Rainham and Wennington parishes and the greater part of Upminster, Cranham and Great Warley. There was a small loss of territory to Romford in the northwest where the urban district came close to Romford town centre. As part of another county review order in 1935 it was enlarged by gaining  of North Ockendon from Orsett Rural District.

Geography

The civil parish of Hornchurch became an urban district in 1926. It included Harold Wood in the northeast and stretched south through the town of Hornchurch to South Hornchurch and the River Thames.

There was a rapid expansion of the population because of suburban house building and new industries were developing in Outer London during the 1930s, such as the nearby Ford Motor Company plant at Dagenham (which also extended into the district) and Londoners were moving to the new suburban estates of houses that were built around them.

The Barking–Upminster railway line through the district was electrified in the 1930s and new stations were opened at Elm Park and Upminster Bridge, in addition to the earlier stations at Hornchurch and Upminster.

Hornchurch Urban District Council
The council was formed in 1926, replacing Hornchurch Parish Council. 13 councillors were elected from the four wards of Harold Wood, North West, South and Village.

After the 1934 enlargement, the district was divided into eight wards, electing 21 councillors as follows:

In 1948 the number of councillors was increased to 27. The number of wards increased to nine in 1952, by the addition of an Elm Park ward, electing a total of 30 councillors. The number of wards increased to 10 in 1958 and the 30 councillors were redistributed.

Hornchurch Urban District Council unsuccessfully petitioned for incorporation as a municipal borough on 20 May 1955. This was refused, pending a review of the local government arrangements of the Greater London area.

Civic works
The council operated Queen's Theatre and constructed Hornchurch Stadium in Upminster. Harrow Lodge Park and Hylands Park were created by the council.

The urban district contained 464 council houses in 1926. The council built a further 150 houses before the Second World War and 3,000 homes between 1945 and 1965.

Parliamentary representation
Hornchurch was within the Romford constituency. In 1945 the Hornchurch constituency was formed to match the urban district.

Demography

Population table

Abolition
The urban district of Hornchurch formed part of the review area of the Royal Commission on Local Government in Greater London. The proposal of the commission was for Hornchurch to form a Greater London borough. The transfer to Greater London was supported by Hornchurch Urban District Council and opposed by Essex County Council. The London Government Bill that resulted from the commission provided for larger areas, with Hornchurch planned to merge with Romford as 'Borough 15'. An amendment was proposed by John Parker, MP for Dagenham, that the Rainham and South Hornchurch wards would become part of 'Borough 14' (Barking/Dagenham), but this was defeated. During the debate Godfrey Lagden, MP for Hornchurch, described the combination of Hornchurch with Romford as a 'happy wedding' with a 'great community of interest'. He suggested Havering-atte-Bower as the name for the new borough. This was adopted in 1965 as the London Borough of Havering, which replaced Hornchurch Urban District and the Municipal Borough of Romford. Havering London Borough Council was elected in 1964 and acted as a shadow authority until 1965, when the transfer from Essex to Greater London was completed.

In 1993 some of the eastern sections of the former urban district around Great Warley were transferred back to Essex.

References

Districts abolished by the London Government Act 1963
History of the London Borough of Havering
History of local government in London (1889–1965)
Urban districts of England
Hornchurch